Yongkang District is a district home to 234,351 people in Tainan, Taiwan.

History
Due to the development of manufacturing and food-processing industries, Yongkang has become a migrant city since the 1970s, attracting many people from neighboring cities who now work and live in the city. Its population experienced a large increase during the 1970s, and Yongkang became the largest city in Tainan County in 1977.

On 1 May 1993 Yongkang was upgraded from rural township to a county-administered city since its population exceeded 150,000. Yongkang was formerly the largest city of Tainan County until it merged with Tainan City to form the new Tainan municipality and became Yongkang District on 25 December 2010. Though the increase in population today is not as rapid as it was before, Yongkang still enjoys the steady growth envied by other cities or towns.

Administrative divisions
The district consists of Wuwang, Wangliao, Yongkang, Puyuan, Daqiao, Wanghang, Wuzhu, Niaosong, Sanmin, Yanhang, Jiading, Dawan, Tungwan, Xiwan, Nanwan, Kunshan, Beiwan, Xinshu, Fuxing, Fuguo, Jianguo, Shenzhou, Xishi, Chenggong, Zhongxing, Shengli, Longtan, Guangfu, Yanzhou, Erwang, Liuge, Sange, Tungqiao, Ankang, Xiqiao, Shangding, Fuhua, Zhengjiang, Zhonghua, Beixing, Longpu, Yongming and Yanxing Village.

Education
 Kun Shan University
 Southern Taiwan University of Science and Technology
 Tainan University of Technology

Tourist attractions
 Jiyu Lake
 Taiwan Metal Creation Museum
 Yunshan Orchard

Transportation

Rail

 Yongkang Station
 Daqiao Station

Road
 National Highway 1
 Provincial Highway 1
 Provincial Highway 19
 Provincial Highway 20

Hospitals
 Chi Mei Medical Center
 Kaohsiung Veterans General Hospital Tainan Branch

Notable natives
 Wei Te-sheng, film director and screenwriter

References

External links